Elymnias agondas, the palmfly, is a butterfly in the family Nymphalidae. It was described by Jean Baptiste Boisduval in 1832. It is endemic to New Guinea and neighbouring Cape York in the Australasian realm.

Subspecies
E. a. agondas (Salawati)
E. a. bioculatus Hewitson, 1851 (New Guinea: Arfak)
E. a. melane Hewitson, 1858 (Kai Island)
E. a. melantho Wallace, 1869 (Gagi Island, Gam Island, Waigeu)
E. a. glaucopis Staudinger, 1894 (Northeast New Guinea)
E. a. melanippe Grose-Smith, 1894 (German New Guinea)
E. a. melanthes Grose-Smith, 1897 (Woodlark Island, Goodenough Island)
E. a. melagondas Fruhstorfer, 1900 (Papua - South New Guinea)
E. a. australiana Fruhstorfer, 1900 (Cape York, North Queensland: Claudie River)
E. a. aruana Fruhstorfer, 1900 (Aru)
E. a. goramensis Fruhstorfer, 1900 (Goram)
E. a. dampierensis Rothschild, 1915 (Dampier Island)

Biology
The larva feeds on Calamus caryotoides.

References

External links
"Elymnias Hübner, 1818" at Markku Savela's Lepidoptera and Some Other Life Forms

Elymnias
Butterflies of Australia
Lepidoptera of New Guinea
Taxa named by Jean Baptiste Boisduval
Butterflies described in 1832